Kadampattukonam is a suburb of Kallambalam Town situated in Varkala Taluk of Thiruvananthapuram district, Kerala, India. It is the border of Trivandrum and Kollam district in NH 66. It is also the starting point of proposed alignment of NH744.

References

Thiruvananthapuram district
Kerala